Robert Dennis Latchford (born 18 January 1951) is an English former footballer who played as a centre forward. He made more than 500 appearances in the Football League, playing for Birmingham City, Everton, Swansea City and Coventry City in the First Division, and won 12 full caps for England.

Career
Latchford was born in Kings Heath, Birmingham. He was transferred from Birmingham City to Everton for £350,000, a British transfer record at the time (Howard Kendall and Archie Styles were transferred to Birmingham City as part of the same deal, with Birmingham being paid just £80,000). At Everton, Latchford was the top scorer for six successive seasons. He scored 30 goals in the 1977–78 season, winning a £10,000 prize offered by a national newspaper for the first footballer to reach that number in a single season. During the mid-seventies, Latchford was widely considered one of the top English forwards of his generation. He earned his first full cap for England in a World Cup qualifier against Italy in 1977. In April 2006 a book was published telling the story of his 1977/78 season. Co-written with journalist Martin O'Boyle, the book supports Everton's former players charity.

The closest he came to a winner's medal at Everton was as a finalist in the League Cup in 1977. Latchford made 268 appearances (3 as substitute) for Everton scoring 138 goals. After a guest stint in Australia for Brisbane Lions in 1981, scoring 4 goals in as many appearances, Latchford left Everton for Swansea, newly promoted to the top tier of English football, scoring a hat-trick on his debut for the Swans. He scored 35 goals in 87 league appearances during his three years at Swansea, meaning that - as at Everton - he averaged a goal nearly every other game.

Latchford later also played for Dutch club NAC Breda (15 Appearances – 13 Goals), Newport County and finally Merthyr Tydfil before retiring as a player in 1987.

During his time at Everton, he was the club's leading post Second World War goalscorer with 138 goals, a record he held until 1989 when Graeme Sharp exceeded Latchford's tally. By the time Latchford left Everton, only Dixie Dean (pre Second World War) had scored more goals for the club in history. 

Latchford played 12 times for England, scoring 5 goals. He represented the players at Professional Footballers' Association, and in 1983 was part of a delegation which negotiated improved terms for players in the FA's deal with broadcasters for live coverage of that season's FA Cup.

Now living in Germany with his family, Latchford makes regular trips back to England to speak on the after-dinner circuit and also has a regular column on Everton independent website, NSNO.co.uk.

Latchford's two brothers, Dave and Peter, were both professional goalkeepers. Like Bob, Dave Latchford played for Birmingham City; whilst Peter Latchford represented West Bromwich Albion before spending over ten years at Celtic. (In March 1974, Bob managed the rare footballing feat of scoring twice against a sibling in a top-flight match .)

Honours
Birmingham City
 FA Youth Cup runner-up: 1967
 Football League Second Division promotion 1972

Everton
 Football League Cup runner-up: 1977

Swansea City
 Welsh Cup: 1982, 1983

NAC Breda
 Eerste Divisie promotion 1984

Merthyr Tydfil
 Welsh Cup: 1987

References

External links

Profile at Post War English & Scottish Football League A - Z Player's Transfer Database profile
Profile  at Swansea City A.F.C.
Everton Giants at Everton F.C.
Aussie Footballers La Butie to Lawrence

1951 births
Living people
Footballers from Birmingham, West Midlands
English footballers
England international footballers
England under-23 international footballers
Association football forwards
Birmingham City F.C. players
Everton F.C. players
Swansea City A.F.C. players
NAC Breda players
Coventry City F.C. players
Lincoln City F.C. players
Newport County A.F.C. players
Merthyr Tydfil F.C. players
English Football League players
First Division/Premier League top scorers
English Football League representative players
National Soccer League (Australia) players
Outfield association footballers who played in goal